Elections to the Baseball Hall of Fame for 1973 followed the system in place since 1971, plus the special election of Roberto Clemente, who had died in a plane crash on New Year's Eve. The Baseball Writers' Association of America (BBWAA) voted by mail to select from recent major league players and elected Warren Spahn. The Veterans Committee met in closed sessions to consider executives, managers, umpires, and earlier major league players. It selected three people: Billy Evans, George Kelly, and Mickey Welch. The Negro Leagues Committee also met in person and selected Monte Irvin. A formal induction ceremony was held in Cooperstown, New York, on August 6, 1973, with Commissioner of Baseball Bowie Kuhn presiding.

BBWAA election
The BBWAA was authorized to elect players active in 1953 or later, but not after 1967; the ballot included candidates from the 1972 ballot who received at least 5% of the vote but were not elected, along with selected players, chosen by a screening committee, whose last appearance was in 1967. All 10-year members of the BBWAA were eligible to vote.

Voters were instructed to cast votes for up to 10 candidates; any candidate receiving votes on at least 75% of the ballots would be honored with induction to the Hall. The ballot consisted of 44 players; a total of 380 ballots were cast, with 285 votes required for election. A total of 3,044 individual votes were cast, an average of 8.01 per ballot. Those candidates receiving less than 5% of the vote will not appear on future BBWAA ballots but may eventually be considered by the Veterans Committee.

Candidates who were eligible for the first time are indicated here with a dagger (†). The one candidate who received at least 75% of the vote and was elected is indicated in bold italics; candidates who have since been elected in subsequent elections are indicated in italics.

Johnny Mize, Marty Marion, Dom DiMaggio, Bobo Newsom, Dutch Leonard and Harry Brecheen were on the ballot for the final time.

The newly-eligible players included 24 All-Stars, 16 of whom were not included on the ballot, representing a total of 95 All-Star selections. Among the new candidates were 17-time All-Star Warren Spahn, 10-time All-Star Whitey Ford, 9-time All-Star Smoky Burgess, 8-time All-Star Dick Groat and Bill Skowron, 7-time All-Star Robin Roberts and 5-time All-Star Earl Battey.

Players eligible for the first time who were not included on the ballot were: Joey Amalfitano, Earl Battey, Jackie Brandt, Eddie Bressoud, Bob Buhl, Don Demeter, Rubén Gómez, Jim King, Johnny Klippstein, Jim Landis, Barry Latman, Charley Lau, Bob Lillis, Jerry Lumpe, Billy O'Dell, Jim O'Toole, Jim Owens, Jimmy Piersall, Andre Rodgers, Johnny Romano, Jack Sanford, Bob Shaw, Bill Skowron, Ralph Terry and Hal Woodeshick.

On March 20, the BBWAA held a special election for Roberto Clemente, who had died in a plane crash on December 31, 1972. Clemente was elected after receiving 393 votes out of 420 ballots cast.

J. G. Taylor Spink Award 
Dan Daniel (1890–1981), Fred Lieb (1888–1980) and J. Roy Stockton (1892–1972) received the J. G. Taylor Spink Award honoring baseball writers. The awards were voted at the December 1972 meeting of the BBWAA, and included in the summer 1973 ceremonies. Daniel and Lieb, the first living recipients of the award, accepted in person.

References

External links
1973 Election at www.baseballhalloffame.org

Baseball Hall of Fame balloting
Hall of Fame balloting